Palenga is a genus of plants, native to South Asia, currently considered synonymous with Putranjiva.

Palenga may also refer to:
 Palenga, Uganda, a town in the Northern Region of Uganda